Isoentomon atlanticum is a species of protura in the family Eosentomidae. It is found in South America.

References

Protura
Articles created by Qbugbot
Animals described in 1947